Pterostylis obtusa, commonly known as the blunt-tongue greenhood, is a species of orchid endemic to New South Wales. It is distinguished from similar greenhood orchids by its thick, flat, platform-like sinus and blunt labellum which is only just visible above the sinus.

Description
There are between three and five stem leaves on the flowering spike. The edges of the petals are flared and the sinus is flat and platform-like with a rolled edge. Flowering occurs from February to June.

Taxonomy and naming
Pterostylis obtusa was first described in 1810 by Robert Brown and the description was published in Prodromus Florae Novae Hollandiae et Insulae Van Diemen. The specific epithet (obtusa) is a Latin word meaning "blunt" or "dull".

Distribution and habitat
The blunt-tongue greenhood grows among grass in moist places on the ranges and tablelands of New South Wales and on Lord Howe Island. Specimens from Tasmania are Pterostylis atrans.

References

obtusa
Endemic orchids of Australia
Orchids of New South Wales
Plants described in 1810